Guy Porter may refer to:
 Guy Porter (athlete)
 Guy Porter (rugby union)